Mistaken Identity is the fifteenth studio album by American singer-songwriter Donna Summer, released on August 23, 1991 by Atlantic Records and Warner Bros. Records. A musical departure for Summer, Mistaken Identity was her last release under Atlantic Records, and The album was a commercial failure and failed to chart, although it reached number 97 on the Top R&B/Hip-Hop Albums. The lead single, "When Love Cries, entered Billboard Hot 100 at number #77, but the second and final single "Work That Magic" failed to chart in the US.

Background
Since making her name as the biggest female star of the disco era in the 1970s, Summer had experimented with different musical genres throughout the 1980s with varying degrees of success. For Mistaken Identity, Summer adopted a more urban style.

Commercial performance
The album was not a commercial success and failed to chart on both the US Billboard 200 and UK Albums Chart. However, it spent a single week on the US Billboard R&B Albums chart, at #97.

Singles
The first single released from the album, "When Love Cries", peaked at #77 on the US Billboard Hot 100 and #18 on the Billboard R&B charts. "Work That Magic" was released as the second and final single in the United Kingdom and reached #74 in the UK Singles Chart.

Track listing

Personnel 
 Donna Summer – lead vocals (1-10, 12), backing vocals (1-6, 8, 9, 10), rap (4), all vocals (11)
 Keith Diamond – keyboards (1-10, 12), rap (2), string arrangements (5, 7)
 Paul Chiten – keyboards (1)
 Eve Nelson – keyboards (2, 3, 4, 6), string arrangements (5, 7), acoustic piano solo (6), acoustic piano (7, 12), additional keyboards (8)
 Anthony Smith – backing vocals (5, 6, 8, 9, 10), keyboards (10), "intro madness" (10)
 Vince Lawrence – keyboards (11)
 Joe Taylor – guitars (1, 7), additional guitars (2, 4)
 Vicki Genfan – guitars (2)
 Rafe Van Hoy – guitars (3)
 Little Axe – guitars (4, 9, 10)
 Paul Pesco – acoustic guitar (5), guitars (7)
 Dave Resnik – guitar "vibe" (11)
 Ira Siegel – guitars (12)
 Carl James – rap (2), bass (7, 12)
 Kaydee – ethnic drums (1), percussion (1, 5), rap (2), "assorted funkiness" (2, 11), drums (9), "intro madness" (10)
 Joe Hornoff – drums (4)
 J.T. Lewis – drums (5, 7, 12)
 O.C. Rodriguez – additional drums (9)
 Bob Conti a.k.a. Bob "Mr. Shaker" Conti – percussion (2, 5, 10)
 Danny Wilensky – saxophone (2, 7)
 Steven McLoughlin – "on a Harley D" (2)
 The 'Heart' Strings (Ann Labin, Cathy Metz, Suzanne Ornstein, Sally Schumway and Suzie Schumway) – strings (5, 7)
 Mary Ellen Bernard – backing vocals (1-4)
 Susan Macke – backing vocals (1-4)
 Gene Miller – backing vocals (1-4)
 Neil Thomas – rap (4)
 Tracy Amos – backing vocals (5, 6, 8, 9, 10)
 Sabelle Breer – backing vocals (5, 6, 8, 9, 10)
 Cliff Dawson – backing vocals (5, 6, 8, 9, 10)
 Craig Derry – backing vocals (5, 6, 8, 9, 10)
 Lauren Kinhan – backing vocals (5, 6, 8, 9, 10)
 Yogi Lee – backing vocals (5, 6, 8, 9, 10)
 Biti Straughn – backing vocals (5, 6, 8, 9, 10)
 The McClendon Choir – backing vocals (12)

Production 
 Keith Diamond – producer, arrangements, mixing 
 Ian Stanley – producer (3), remixing (3)
 George Karras – engineer, mixing 
 J.C. Convertino – additional engineer
 Acar Key – additional engineer
 Peter Robbins – additional engineer
 Bob Rosa – additional engineer
 Shawn 'Fido' Berman – assistant engineer
 Carl Glanville – assistant engineer 
 Jeff Lippay – assistant engineer 
 Steven John McLoughlin – assistant engineer 
 Darien Sahanaja – assistant engineer 
 Joe Seta – assistant engineer 
 Andy Udoff – assistant engineer 
 Adam Yellin – assistant engineer 
 Herb Powers Jr. – mastering
 Donna Summer – album art concept
 Tracy Nicholas Bledsoe – album cover coordination
 Bill Smith Studio (London) – design 
 Harry Langdon – photography 
 Gina Delgado – stylist

Studios
 Recorded at Unique Recording Studios, The Hit Factory, Electric Lady Studios, RPM Studios and My Blue Heaven Studios (New York City, New York); Interface Studios (Bayside, New York); Presence Studios (Westport, CT); Rumbo Recorders (Los Angeles, California); Encore Studios (Burbank, California); Track Record Studios (North Hollywood, California); American Recording Co. (Calabasas, California).
 Mastered at The Hit Factory.
 Studio managers – Tony Drootin (Unique Studios, NY); Vicki Camblin  (Rumbo Recorders, LA); Troy Germano (The Hit Factory, NY); Bob Mason (RPM Studios, NY); Daryl Simmons (Encore Studios, LA); John Russell (Presence Studios, CT).

Charts

References 

1991 albums
Donna Summer albums
Atlantic Records albums
New jack swing albums